Imran Nasir Ahmad Khan (born 6 September 1973) is a British former politician and convicted sex offender who served as Member of Parliament (MP) for Wakefield from the 2019 general election until 2022. Elected as a Conservative, Ahmad Khan had the party whip withdrawn in June 2021; he was subsequently expelled from the party following his criminal conviction for child sexual assault in 2022.

Born and educated in Wakefield in West Yorkshire, Ahmad Khan studied at the Pushkin Institute in Moscow and King's College London. He worked for the United Nations as special assistant for political affairs in Mogadishu and as a senior consultant for M&C Saatchi. A supporter of Brexit, he was elected in the 2019 general election and attributed his victory to voters' support for leaving the European Union in the 2016 referendum.

In 2021, he was charged under the Sexual Offences Act 2003 with having sexually assaulted a 15-year-old boy in 2008. Ahmad Khan denied the accusation "in the strongest terms". On 11 April 2022, following a two week-long trial in the Southwark Crown Court, he was convicted of sexually assaulting a minor. He resigned as an MP on 3 May and was jailed for 18 months on 23 May.

Early life and career
Ahmad Khan was born in Pinderfields Hospital, Wakefield, where both his parents worked. His father, Saeed Ahmad Khan, was born in the North West Frontier Province of British India (now in Pakistan), and worked as a consultant dermatologist. His English mother was a state registered nurse and midwife. His grandmother, Joyce Reynolds, also worked at Pinderfields Hospital as a staff sister. His grandfather was a miner. His brother is lawyer Karim Ahmad Khan KC.

Ahmad Khan attended the local, independent Silcoates School. He studied Russian at the Pushkin Institute in Moscow, and earned a bachelor's degree in war studies at King's College London. He worked for the United Nations as special assistant for political affairs in Mogadishu and as a senior consultant for the advertising agency, M&C Saatchi. Having worked as a counter-terrorism expert prior to becoming an MP, he joked his experience in conflict zones such as Somalia and Afghanistan gave him what would be needed to build bridges between warring parties in the Brexit battle.

Political career

Member of Parliament (2019–2022) 
In the 2019 general election, Ahmad Khan defeated the incumbent Labour MP, Mary Creagh, to become the first Conservative MP for the constituency in 89 years. Wakefield voted almost 2-to-1 in favour of leaving the European Union in the 2016 referendum and was a target seat for the Conservatives. He was selected after the withdrawal of a candidate whose racist and sexist social media posts were uncovered. Labour's Creagh said: "Will the next candidate they parachute in be any better? Don’t hold your breath." Ahmad Khan responded by taking part in a skydive over the town and retorted he was "a local lad born and bred in Wakefield, of Wakefield stock. I couldn't figuratively parachute in—and I didn't want to disappoint her—so I decided I would literally parachute in."

In his maiden speech in January 2020, Ahmad Khan spoke of being part of "a vibrant and dynamic pack of Yorkshire MPs". He called for equality of opportunity to be made real, and for more patriotism: "I see perhaps more clearly than most the deep and enduring importance of core British values such as compassion, tolerance and fairness, especially at a time when those values are perceived as under threat in many parts of our world."

Reviewing sexual offences against minors

Khan was part of a panel advising on grooming gangs and contributed to a paper called "Group-based child sexual exploitation characteristics of offending" while police were investigating him for child sexual abuse. Responding to the disclosures, Labour's shadow cabinet minister, Louise Haigh said, "Khan's victim told the Conservatives about sickening sexual abuse, and they did nothing, and then shamefully appointed him to sit alongside survivors of child sexual exploitation. (...) The Tories have serious questions to answer over how they gave this man free rein to exploit his position and victims of abuse. Boris Johnson and Priti Patel need to come clean about what the Conservative party knew and how they could possibly have put victims in this horrifying position in the first place." The Home Office said it was not aware of the allegations against him at the time he was on the advisory panel.

Activist Sammy Woodhouse was targeted, groomed and abused aged 14 and took part in a review with Khan. She said, "This was important work that I undertook in good faith, but I am disgusted to have been put in a position where I was working with a man later convicted for child sexual assault. Knowing now that the Conservatives had already received complaints from a victim about this man, it is gut-wrenching for me as a survivor that they could possibly have allowed him to be considered for this role."

COVID-19 pandemic response
Ahmad Khan organised a shipment of 110,000 reusable face masks through connections with the charity Solidarités international and the Vietnamese Government. Most of the masks were for the Mid Yorkshire Hospitals NHS Trust's Pontefract, Pinderfields and Dewsbury and District Hospitals and 10,000 were distributed by the trust to local care homes and hospices. He launched 'Wakefield Together' to co-ordinate local efforts to tackle difficulties arising from the COVID-19 pandemic.

Ahmad Khan helped secure £2.9 million for Wakefield's art hubs, including Theatre Royal Wakefield, the Creative Art House, and the West Yorkshire Theatre Dance Centre, via the Culture Recovery Fund.

Resignation
Following his conviction for sexual assault, Ahmad Khan announced on 14 April 2022 that he would be resigning as an MP. On 28 April 2022 he announced he had tendered his letter of resignation, effective from the end of April. He was to receive the entirety of his April salary upon his resignation.

His resignation was effected on 3 May 2022 following his appointment to the Chiltern Hundreds.

As a result of this a by-election was held on 23 June, in which Labour recovered the seat.

Political positions

Brexit
Ahmad Khan supported Britain's withdrawal from the European Union. In an interview with Channel 4 he attributed his success in the 2019 general election to "Islington Remainers" who branded Leave voters "stupid, uneducated, racist or wrong". He has stated that he decided to stand in the election because he came to believe British democracy was "under threat".

In September 2020, in a debate about the United Kingdom Internal Market Bill, Ahmad Khan declared: "I am an ardent supporter of Brexit and look forward eagerly to the opportunity to bolster the United Kingdom's position by becoming an independent, self-governing nation, possessed of the confidence that flows from our vision and principled values". In his speech, he went on to explain his concerns over the Internal Market Bill before backing the legislation.

National Trust coverage of slavery 
Following an interim report on the connections between colonialism and properties now in the care of the National Trust, including links with historic slavery, Ahmad Khan was among the signatories of a letter to The Telegraph from the "Common Sense Group" of Conservative Parliamentarians. The letter accused the National Trust of being "coloured by cultural Marxist dogma, colloquially known as the 'woke agenda'".

Personal life
Ahmad Khan describes himself as a "proud Yorkshireman" and a member of the Ahmadiyya community. Shortly after his election in 2019, the LGBT+ Conservatives group described Ahmad Khan as 'openly gay' and he made news worldwide for becoming the first gay Muslim to be elected. They subsequently clarified that Ahmad Khan "fully endorses" the group's aims "but is not an out LGBT MP". The confusion arose after an application was made in his name to a fund to help LGBT+ Conservative candidates. Ahmad Khan subsequently came out as gay during his trial in 2022.

Sexual offence
In June 2021, Ahmad Khan was charged on suspicion of a historical sexual offence of groping a 15-year-old boy, in Staffordshire, in 2008. Ahmad Khan  denied the accusation; the Conservative Party suspended the whip from Ahmad Khan pending the outcome of the prosecution.

Ahmad Khan attempted to have the case heard in secrecy, first arguing that as a serving MP there were concerns about his safety and that to name him in court would breach his human rights, and attempted to have the age of his victim withheld. His applications were rejected by Chief Magistrate Paul Goldspring at Westminster Magistrates' Court, who said, in favour of open justice: "Damage to reputation is not a ground for making of an order." Ahmad Khan, an Ahmadi Muslim, applied, unsuccessfully, to have the case heard anonymously as the consumption of alcohol and homosexual acts are strictly prohibited, and reporting them could expose him to risk both in the UK and abroad.

On 10 September 2021, he pleaded not guilty at London's Old Bailey; the case was transferred to Southwark Crown Court, for trial on 21 March 2022 on a single count of sexual assault. At trial he denied accusations of dragging a 15-year-old boy upstairs, forcing the boy to drink alcohol and watch pornography, and groping the boy's groin. The complainant called police after Ahmad Khan was elected to Parliament. The complainant's older brother gave evidence that at the same party the MP had asked if he was "a true Scotsman" and lifted his kilt, before "lunging" at him. Another witness at the trial described waking to find Ahmad Khan performing a sex act on him after a party in Pakistan in 2010 where the pair had drunk whisky and smoked marijuana.

On 11 April 2022 he was found guilty of sexually assaulting the 15-year-old boy, contrary to section 3 of the Sexual Offences Act 2003, and jailed for 18 months on 23 May. Mr Justice Jeremy Baker said that the boy, who was particularly vulnerable, had been profoundly psychologically affected, that Ahmad Khan did not regret his assault, and that he had displayed significant brutality. The victim stated that he had found it hard to be touched, and his mental health was harmed, including suicidal thoughts. Shortly after the trial Ahmad Khan was accused of having offered oral sex to a 16-year-old boy at a birthday party in Suffolk in 2015, and offering to take the youth to a hotel to use cocaine and hire a sex worker.

Ahmad Khan was expelled from the Conservative Party following the conviction. Ahmad Khan appealed against conviction and sentence, but the appeal was dismissed in December 2022. Conservative MP Crispin Blunt, chair of the Parliamentary committee on LGBTQ+ rights, defended Ahmad Khan after the trial, but was criticised for his "disgraceful" comments on the conviction as a "dreadful miscarriage of justice" and an international scandal". Several members of the committee resigned in response to his statement; Blunt subsequently apologised and withdrew his comments.

On 5 December 2022, Imran Ahmad Khan lost an appeal at the Court of Appeal. Both appeals were dismissed by three senior judges. Dismissing the conviction appeal, Mr Justice Sweeney, sitting with Dame Victoria Sharp and Mr Justice Linden, said they had “no doubt” that the trial was fair and the conviction was safe.

The hearing was also attended by the Tory MP Crispin Blunt

Ahmad Khan was released from prison on 21 February 2023, having served half of his eighteen month sentence.

References

External links
Official website 

1973 births
Living people
21st-century English criminals
Alumni of King's College London
Associates of King's College London
British Ahmadis
British politicians of Pakistani descent
Conservative Party (UK) MPs for English constituencies
Criminals from Yorkshire
English male criminals
English people convicted of child sexual abuse
English people of Pakistani descent
English politicians convicted of crimes
English prisoners and detainees
Gay politicians
Independent members of the House of Commons of the United Kingdom
LGBT members of the Parliament of the United Kingdom
Gay Muslims
English LGBT politicians
People educated at Silcoates School
People from Wakefield
Politicians affected by a party expulsion process
Politicians convicted of sex offences
Prisoners and detainees of England and Wales
UK MPs 2019–present
Politicians from Wakefield
Political sex scandals in the United Kingdom